Universal Studios Theme Parks Adventure, known in Japan as , is a 2001 video game developed by Nai'a Digital Works and published by Kemco for the GameCube. Set in the Universal Studios Japan park, the object of the game is to complete several mini-games loosely based on the real-life attractions Back to the Future: The Ride, Jaws, Jurassic Park River Adventure, E.T. Adventure, Backdraft, Wild, Wild, Wild West Stunt Show, and Waterworld. The player is encouraged to collect trash located in the park, wear merchandise based on the respective franchises, and complete movie quizzes, in which the player must answer trivia questions about the Universal Studios films. 

The game was panned by critics for its tedious gameplay, poor graphics and anomalous nature. It is frequently censured as one of the worst video games ever made.

Gameplay

The object of the game is to collect stamps by going on rides throughout the park. To get on the rides, the player needs points, collected from picking up trash around the park and putting it into trash cans. The player can also meet and shake hands with costumed characters inside the park for additional points. The game uses a fixed camera that does not move or zoom in with the player. There are set camera vantages that the player moves in and out of by going outside of the field of view to go to the next camera point. Rides include Back to the Future: The Ride, Jaws, Jurassic Park River Adventure, and E.T. Adventure. Minigames, hosted by Woody Woodpecker, include a Universal Studios quiz of film-related questions and puzzle games such as Concentration (memory match).

Reception

The game was panned by critics. Matt Casamassina of IGN criticized the game's graphics, comparing it to a "bad N64 game", and noted that the game still suffered frame-rate issues. UGO rated the game #78 on their list of "The Worst Video Games of All Time. Brad Shoemaker of GameSpot panned it in his review, saying: "The game is too frustrating and convoluted for kids to have any fun with it, and all but the most desperate adult GameCube fans will find it tedious and unentertaining as well." Matt Casamassina of IGN also panned it, calling it "a jumbled mess of disorganized goals, sloppy navigation and boring destinations topped off with incredibly dated graphics and an overall adventure that can fairly easily be beaten, if one has the stomach for it" and concluded: "Not recommended for young or adult gamers." It remained NGC Magazine UK lowest-rated GameCube game until surpassed by Batman: Dark Tomorrow.

References

External links

2001 video games
Dinosaurs in video games
Adventure games
Back to the Future (franchise) video games
Crossover video games
E.T. the Extra-Terrestrial video games
Hanna-Barbera
Jaws (franchise) video games
Jurassic Park video games
Kemco games
GameCube games
GameCube-only games
Universal Pictures
Video games based on films
Video games based on adaptations
Video games developed in Japan
Woody Woodpecker
Video games set in amusement parks
Multiplayer and single-player video games
Party video games
Works based on amusement park attractions